The 32nd Golden Horse Awards (Mandarin:第32屆金馬獎) took place on December 9, 1995 at Sun Yat-sen Memorial Hall in Taipei, Taiwan.

References

32nd
1995 film awards
1995 in Taiwan